Bethungra is a locality in Junee Shire in the South West Slopes region of New South Wales, Australia situated on the Olympic Highway about 13 kilometres northeast of Illabo and 24 kilometres southwest of Cootamundra.

History 
Bethungra Post Office opened on 1 December 1875.

Just to the north of the town lies the Bethungra Spiral, a rail spiral built on the Main South railway line to ease the gradients when the line was duplicated between 1941 and 1946. A railway station was located in the town between 1878 and the 1980s, and has now been demolished.

In 1885, an accident occurred near Bethungra when a train derailed at a washed away culvert, killing five persons.

Heritage listings
Bethungra has a number of heritage-listed sites, including:
 Main Southern railway: Bethungra Spiral

Gallery

References

External links

 
Towns in New South Wales
Junee Shire
Main Southern railway line, New South Wales